The 1947 Honduran football season was the first edition of the Amateur League, won by C.D. Victoria, after winning the championship round against F.C. Motagua and C.D. Marathón.  Victoria was managed by Francisco Detari and some of the club's famous players at that time were Héctor Briza, Julián Fiallos, Félix Chimilio and Leonardo Godoy.  The trophy was known as the Winston Churchill Cup and was delivered by British Prime Minister Rees John Sowler.

Regional champions

Known results

National championship round
Played in a double round-robin format between the regional champions.  Also known as the Triangular.

Known results

Victoria's lineup

References

Liga Amateur de Honduras seasons
Honduras
1947 in Honduras